The 43rd Baeksang Arts Awards ceremony took place on April 25, 2007, at the National Theater of Korea in Seoul. It was presented by IS Plus Corp. and broadcast on SBS.

Nominations and winners
Complete list of nominees and winners:

(Winners denoted in bold)

Film

Television

References

External links
 

Baeksang
Baeksang
Baeksang Arts Awards
Baek
Baek
2000s in Seoul